FTV News (Pinyin: Mín shì xīnwén tái) is a digital television news channel operated by Formosa Television (FTV) in Taiwan, launched on 11 June 1997.

See also
 Media of Taiwan

External links
 FTV News official website

Television channels and stations established in 1996
24-hour television news channels in Taiwan
Television news in Taiwan